The 2014 Kumho Tyres V8 Touring Car Series was an Australian motor racing series for V8 Touring Cars, which are de-registered and superseded former V8 Supercars. Although the series utilised cars built for V8 Supercar racing, it was not an official V8 Supercar series. It involved two classes, the S class for cars with sequential gearboxes, and the H class for cars with H-pattern gearboxes.

It was the seventh running of the V8 Touring Car National Series. The series took place on the program of Shannons Nationals Motor Racing Championships events. It began at Mallala Motor Sport Park on 26 April and finished at Sydney Motorsport Park on 2 November after six meetings held in New South Wales, Victoria, Queensland and South Australia.

The sequential gearbox class and the overall championship was won by rookie Justin Ruggier, in a battle with Ryan Simpson. Although Simpson won three rounds to Ruggier's two, Simpson suffered from penalties and not being allowed to compete in one race at Phillip Island due to noise restrictions. Simpson still managed to break the record for the number of wins in the category with 10 victories. Matt Chahda finished 4th in the series and clinched the title for the highest placed driver with a H-pattern gearbox.

Teams and drivers

The following teams and drivers competed in the 2014 Kumho Tyres V8 Touring Car Series:

Calendar
The series was contested over six rounds.

Points system

Series results

References

Kumho
V8 Touring Car Series